Óscar Pino Hinds (born 26 October 1993) is a Cuban wrestler competing both in Greco-Roman and freestyle competitions.

Career 

In 2016, he won the gold medal in the men's Greco-Roman 130 kg event at the Pan American Wrestling Championships held in Frisco, United States. He repeated this in the same event at the Pan American Wrestling Championships in 2017 and 2018. In 2019 and 2020, he competed in the men's freestyle 125 kg event winning a bronze medal on both occasions.

At the World Wrestling Championships he won a total of three medals: in 2019 he won the silver medal and both in 2017 and in 2018 he won one of the bronze medals.

He won the gold medal in his event at the 2022 Pan American Wrestling Championships held in Acapulco, Mexico.

Achievements

References

External links 
 

Living people
1993 births
Place of birth missing (living people)
Cuban male sport wrestlers
World Wrestling Championships medalists
Pan American Games medalists in wrestling
Pan American Games silver medalists for Cuba
Wrestlers at the 2019 Pan American Games
Medalists at the 2019 Pan American Games
Pan American Wrestling Championships medalists
21st-century Cuban people